Dalla is a band specialising in traditional Cornish music

Dalla may also refer to:
 The former name of Dala Township, Myanmar
 Dalla (skipper), a genus of skippers in the family Hesperiidae
 Dalla Hill, Nigeria
 Dalla people, indigenous Australian people from southern Queensland
 Lucio Dalla (1943–2012), an Italian singer-songwriter and musician
 Hadron Dalla, a character in the Paratime series

See also 
 Dala (disambiguation)
 Dallah (disambiguation)